1V-LSD or 1-valeryl-D-lysergic acid diethylamide is a psychotropic substance and a research chemical with psychedelic effects. 1V-LSD is an artificial derivative of natural lysergic acid, which occurs in ergot alkaloids, as well as being an analogue of LSD. 
1V-LSD has been sold online until an  amendment to the German NpSG was enforced in 2022 which controls 1P-LSD and now 1cP-LSD, 1V-LSD and several other lysergamides.

Pharmacology 

As demonstrated with other N-acylated derivatives of LSD, 1V-LSD is believed to serve as a prodrug for LSD but may also act as a weak partial agonist at the 5-HT2A receptor.

Animal studies 
A Head-twitch response assay in mice found that 1V-LSD has a similar potency to 1P-LSD and 1cP-LSD, with behavioral effects also closely resembling these structural analogs.

Chemistry 
1V-LSD is the condensation product of valeric acid (pentanoic acid) and LSD, where the valeroyl group is substituted on the NH position of the indole moiety.
Ehrlich's reagent is used to identify the presence of an indole moiety; the chemical backbone of the lysergamide and ergoline molecules. However, as with other N-acylated lysergamides, 1V-LSD reacts very slowly to Ehrlich reagent and may not give reliable results if the reagent isn't fresh.

Legal position
1V-LSD is illegal in the United States as a Schedule 1 drug under the Federal Analogue Act

Since March 2nd 2022, 1V-LSD has been under investigation in Sweden and may therefore soon become controlled.

1V-LSD was placed under legal control in South Korea in July 2022 on a temporary but renewable basis.

An amendment to the NpSG banned the sale of 1V-LSD in Germany in September 2022. Due to a interpunctation error in the actualised NpSG, the ban never took effect. The law was amended in March 2023, now banning 1V-LSD.

See also 
 1B-LSD
 1cP-LSD
 1D-LSD
 1P-LSD
 AL-LAD
 LSD

References 

Designer drugs
Psychedelic_drugs
Lysergamides
Prodrugs
Serotonin receptor agonists
Fatty acid amides